Conceveiba is a plant genus of the family Euphorbiaceae, first described as a genus in 1775. It is native to South America and Central America.

Species
 Conceveiba guianensis Aubl. - Brazil, Peru, Bolivia, Ecuador, Colombia, Venezuela, 3 Guianas 
 Conceveiba hostmanii Benth. - Guyana, Suriname, Amazonas State in Brazil
 Conceveiba krukoffii Steyerm. - Venezuela, French Guiana, NW Brazil
 Conceveiba latifolia Benth. - Colombia, Venezuela, Peru, Amazonas State in Brazil
 Conceveiba martiana Baill. - Venezuela, French Guiana, NW Brazil, Colombia, Ecuador, Peru, Bolivia
 Conceveiba maynasensis Secco - Loreto in Peru
 Conceveiba parvifolia McPherson - Panama, NW Colombia
 Conceveiba pleiostemona Donn.Sm. - Costa Rica, Nicaragua, Colombia, Venezuela
 Conceveiba praealta (Croizat) Punt ex J.Murillo - NW Brazil
 Conceveiba ptariana (Steyerm.) Jabl. - S Venezuela
 Conceveiba rhytidocarpa Müll.Arg. - Colombia, Ecuador, Peru
 Conceveiba santanderensis J.Murillo - NW Colombia
 Conceveiba terminalis (Baill.) Müll.Arg. - Venezuela, Guyana, Suriname, NW Brazil, Colombia, Peru
 Conceveiba tristigmata J.Murillo - Colombia, Venezuela, NW Brazil

formerly included
moved to other genera (Alchornea Aparisthmium Aubletiana Cladogynos Neoboutonia )

References

Alchorneae
Euphorbiaceae genera